The year 1539 in science and technology included many events, some of which are listed here.

Botany
 Hieronymus Bock publishes the first edition of his flora of Germany, the Kreutterbuch, adopting a new system of classification based on his observations.

Cartography
 Olaus Magnus publishes his Carta marina in Italy, the first detailed map of Scandinavia.

Exploration
 May 30 – Hernando de Soto lands at Tampa Bay, Florida.
 August–September – Francisco de Ulloa explores the Gulf of California.

Medicine
 Johannes Baptista Montanus is appointed professor of medicine at the University of Padua where he introduces clinical medicine, including bedside examination, into the curriculum, integrating theory and practice.

Births
 September/October – José de Acosta, naturalist (died 1600)
 exact date unknown – Olivier de Serres, soil scientist (died 1619)

Deaths
 August – Vannoccio Biringuccio, Italian metallurgist (born 1480)

References

 
16th century in science
1530s in science